Hasan Sara (also Romanized as Ḩasan Sarā; also known as Ḩanak Sarā and Ḩasanak Sarā) is a village in Reza Mahalleh Rural District, in the Central District of Rudsar County, Gilan Province, Iran. At the 2006 census, its population was 796, in 220 families.

References 

Populated places in Rudsar County